Whistler station is a railway station located in Whistler, British Columbia, Canada, along the BC Rail line.  The operations of the line are now run by Canadian National via a long-term lease between CN & BC Rail.  Rocky Mountaineer runs a single train that calls at the station once a week in high-season, the Rainforest to Gold Rush which provides service from North Vancouver railway station to Quesnel railway station and Jasper railway station. Rocky Mountaineer discontinued the Whistler Sea to Sky Climb, its once-daily service to Whistler, in 2016.

The PGE line was established in 1912, and rail service to the Whistler area has been provided since the early days of operation until BC Rail ended all passenger service in 2002.  The line is now mostly freight only, with the high-end Rocky Mountaineer utilising the corridor once a week. The current station building was built for Whistler Rail Tours (former operators of the Whistler Sea to Sky Climb) in 2007.

During the 2010 Winter Olympics, a special Rocky Mountaineer train sponsored by the government of the neighbouring province of Alberta served as public transit between Vancouver and Whistler.

References

Railway stations in Canada opened in 2007
Rocky Mountaineer stations in British Columbia
Whistler, British Columbia